This is a list of seasons completed by the Cleveland Thunderbolts. The Thunderbolts were a professional arena football franchise of the Arena Football League (AFL), based in Richfield, Ohio. The team was established in 1991 and folded in 1994. The Thunderbolts made the playoffs once.

References
 
 

Arena Football League seasons by team
 
Cleveland-related lists
Ohio sports-related lists